Karłowo may refer to the following places:
Karłowo, Masovian Voivodeship (east-central Poland)
Karłowo, Bytów County in Pomeranian Voivodeship (north Poland)
Karłowo, Pomeranian Voivodeship (north Poland)
Karłowo, Warmian-Masurian Voivodeship (north Poland)

See also

Karlow (name)